The Borderlands Poles, also known as the Borderlands groups, is a term for the collection of the ethnographic groups of Polish people from the area of the Eastern Borderlands, an area to the east of modern borders of Poland, within the modern territory of Belarus, Lithuania, Ukraine. They are mostly descendants of Masovians, and to lesser extend, Lesser Poland people, who colonized the area across centuries. The groups aren't directly connected, having different origins, and developing separately. However, they are categorized together, due to the shared factor of devolving on the eastern boundaries of Polish population, influenced by the other ethnic groups located to the east. In the aftermath of World War II, they were displaced from the Soviet Union to Poland, mostly in the first repatriation of 1944–1946, and later in the second repatriation of 1955–1959. As such, they, and their descendants, now live across Poland. Such people are also known as the Bug River Poles.

Groups 
There are several ethnographic groups categorized as part of the Borderlands groups. However, there is not one agreed upon list. Groups included in the list by various ethnographers include: Bug River Podlachians, Chełm group, Hrubieszovians, Lviv–Ternopil group, Podlachians, Przemyśl group, Valley people, Uplanders, and Vilnius group.

Formerly, some ethnographers, such as Jan Stanisław Bystroń, also included Lublinians and Rzeszovians, however, others, such as Janusz Kamocki, basing the research by Jan Natanson-Leski, state that they are instead the indigenous populations in the area.

Notes

References 

Lechites
Polish people
Slavic ethnic groups
Ethnic groups in Poland
Ethnic groups in Lithuania
Ethnic groups in Belarus
Ethnic groups in Ukraine
Polish diaspora in Ukraine